Gossip Girl is an American young adult novel series written by Cecily von Ziegesar and published by Little, Brown and Company, a subsidiary of the Hachette Group. The series revolves around the lives and romances of the privileged socialite teenagers at the Constance Billard School for Girls, an elite private school in New York City's Upper East Side. The books primarily focus on best friends Blair Waldorf and  Serena van der Woodsen, whose experiences are among those chronicled by the eponymous gossip blogger. The novel series is based on the author's experiences at Nightingale-Bamford School and on what she heard from friends.

Publication 
The first novel, Gossip Girl, was released in April 2002; the eleventh novel of the series was released in May 2007, with a prequel novel following in October 2007. Another follow-up novel, in which the characters return home from college for the holidays, was released in hardback format in November 2009. The original novel became the inspiration for the Gossip Girl teen drama television series, created by Josh Schwartz and Stephanie Savage, which premiered on The CW on September 19, 2007. There are now 13 novels.

In May 2008, a follow-up series,
Gossip Girl: The Carlyles, began publication, following the Carlyle triplets as they begin moving to the Upper East Side. As of October 2009, four novels have been released in this series. Ziegesar created a spin-off series, The It Girl, which began publication in 2005, and Yen Press has adapted the series into a manga series titled Gossip Girl: For Your Eyes Only.

History
The novel that started the series, Gossip Girl, was published in paperback format in April 2002. Two new novels were released annually until the final novel, Don't You Forget About Me, was released in May 2007, showing the main characters graduating from high school and moving on to college and other pursuits. A prequel novel, It Had To Be You, was released in October 2007 in hardcover and electronic book format. It detailed the events that occurred a year before the first novel. A box set containing the eleven novels of the series and the prequel novel, in paperback format, was released November 1, 2009. Two days later, a sequel novel, I Will Always Love You was released. The hardcover book tells the story of the main characters returning home from college for the holidays. Hachette Group re-released all of the original novels in electronic book format between 2008 and 2009.

Books nine, ten and eleven of the main series were ghostwritten.

In December 2009, Yen Press announced that it was working with Korean artist Hyekyung Baek to create a manga adaptation of the series titled Gossip Girl: For Your Eyes Only. Rather than adapting the original novels, however, the graphic novels feature original stories with the same characters. It was serialized in the company's anthology magazine Yen Plus, from August 2010 to December 2013.

In October 2011, a parody of the series Gossip Girl: Psycho Killer was released. It is written by Cecily von Ziegesar. The identity of Gossip Girl has not been released to the public.

Characters

 Blair Waldorf - a beautiful and active student of her elite high school. Blair uses money and scheming to get what she wants. Blair attends Yale University, the school of her dreams, after graduating from high school. Throughout the series, she has an on-off relationship with Nate Archibald, whom she always imagined marrying. At the end of the series, Nate admits he loves her, and always will. Gossip Girl herself says that the two are just meant to be together. Blair's style and attitude portrays her as being quite preppy.
Serena van der Woodsen - an angelically attractive and charming it-girl who returns to the Upper East Side after getting expelled from boarding school. Nate's interest in Serena causes conflict between her and her frenemy, Blair, who is also Nate's girlfriend. In the end, Serena settles in New York City. She is an heiress to a billion dollar Dutch shipping  empire and a socialite who later becomes a successful Hollywood actress.
 Nate Archibald is a wealthy, good-looking lacrosse player from St. Jude's School for Boys. He has dated a number of girls in the series, but his only serious relationships have been with his on-again/off-again girlfriend, Blair Waldorf and her close friend Serena. After stealing his lacrosse coach's Viagra, he relied on Blair and her alumnus father's connections to get accepted into Yale. Nate eventually left to sail around the world with his father's Navy mentor because he is unable to choose between Blair and Serena. In the sequel, he attends Deep Springs recommended by Chuck Bass, and then Brown University. Eventually, he professes his love for Blair over Serena, which leaves Serena heartbroken and Blair overjoyed. He and Serena got into every college that they entered for.
Dan Humphrey is a sexy, skinny, sensitive, caffeine-addicted poet who often sees the darker side of things. A romantic whose imagination runs off wildly at the worst times, he is also over-analytical and easily frustrated. Dan was attracted to Serena when he saved her from walking into a car when she was drunk one Thanksgiving. They officially meet later at school and briefly date. Dan had experimented with homosexuality, before he began dating Vanessa Abrams (whom he had known at his old state school). He is a published writer of poetry and songs. At the end of the series, he is attending Evergreen State College in Washington. In the sequel, he transfers to Columbia University. He dated Serena van der Woodsen and Mystery Craze before settling down with Vanessa Abrams.
Jenny Humphrey - the younger sister of Dan, a fan of Serena but has major insecurities with her huge chest. She later gets her own spinoff series, The It Girl.
Vanessa Abrams is a budding filmmaker and the total opposite of most of her classmates, sporting a shaved head and always wears black. She has a shaky relationship with Dan Humphrey, particularly after she ends up living with the Humphrey family for a short time. At the end of the series, she is attending New York University. In the prequel, it is revealed she shaved her head in front of Blair.
Chuck Bass is the series' handsome, lust-driven antagonist who tries to take advantage of several girls, though it is eventually revealed that he is quite possibly bisexual. He is largely despised by other characters, but due to his wealth and power, he is tolerated. Notes for a planned prequel to the series revealed that Chuck was originally called "Chip Wiskers", but the name was later scrapped in favor of the more substantial sounding variation of the "wood word + animal name" themed moniker applied in the final draft. Plans to depict "Chip" as a Rhythm Gymnast were also cut, due to the overtly feminine nature of the sport. At the end of the series, he is not accepted into any college that he applied to and claims he is going to military college. However, he never arrives at the school and his whereabouts remain unknown. He later returns to New York as a changed, respectable man, albeit somewhat dependent on his wealth. In the books, Chuck is a secondary character. However, he is elevated to a primary role in its television adaptation, in which he holds an intense relationship with Blair, and is best friends with Nate and Serena.

List of novels

Gossip Girl

Gossip Girl: The Carlyles

Reception
The Gossip Girl series has received positive and negative attention. 

The American Library Association selected the Gossip Girl series as Quick Picks for Reluctant Young Adult Readers in 2003. In 2008, it was also named Booklist Editors' Choice: Adult Books for Young Adults.

Despite the above, the Gossip Girl series has frequently been the center of controversy due to homosexuality, offensive language, drugs, being sexually explicit, and being unsuited to age group. The series appears on the American Library Association's list of the one hundred most banned and challenged books from 2000 to 2009, and 2010 to 2019 (56). The series also appeared in the top ten list in 2006 (2), 2008 (7), and 2011 (9).

The criticism of the Gossip Girl series primarily revolves around whether the events depicted in the story are appropriate for the teenage audience the books attract. American author and feminist Naomi Wolf in 2006 called the books "corruption with a cute overlay." Wolf also claims that "sex saturates the Gossip Girl books.... This is not the frank sexual exploration found in a Judy Blume novel, but teenage sexuality via Juicy Couture, blasé and entirely commodified."

Pam Spencer Holley, former YALSA President with the American Library Association (ALA), presents a different point of view, claiming simply to be "happy to see teen girls reading." Confident that young girls will move onto more respected literature, Holley points out, "Unless you read stuff that's perhaps not the most literary, you'll never understand what good works are." She went on to say, "Nobody complains about the adult women who read Harlequin romances." Holley created a new ALA book list to encourage teens to consult a list of recommendations for "both avid and reluctant readers, who are looking for books like Cecily von Ziegesar's Gossip Girl series. 'The books on this list are perfect for when your readers have finished with every Gossip Girl title in your library and are clamoring for another book like the Gossip Girl.'"

Television adaptation

The television adaptation of the novel series, also titled Gossip Girl, was picked up by The CW. Josh Schwartz, the creator of The O.C., is executive producer for the project. In the show, Blake Lively plays Serena, Leighton Meester plays Blair, Chace Crawford plays Nate, Penn Badgley plays Dan, Ed Westwick plays Chuck, Taylor Momsen plays Jenny and Jessica Szohr plays Vanessa. The show is loosely based on the books and does not follow the same story line.  Some key characters from the books, such as Aaron Rose or the Lord, are introduced into the show with different storylines, and some characters undergo changes to their personality and characteristics. For example, Serena's older brother in the books, Erik van der Woodsen, is two years younger than her instead of older, and the characters of Serena, Blair, Chuck and Nate have been best friends since childhood compared to the novel series where the story's main friendship was only between Serena, Blair and Nate; with Chuck not being one of the main characters.

References

External links

American book series
American young adult novels
Book series introduced in 2002
Chick lit novels
 
Lagardère SCA franchises
Little, Brown and Company books
Novels by Cecily von Ziegesar
Novels set in New York City
Novels set in boarding schools
Young adult novel series
American novels adapted into television shows
Alloy Entertainment